Host Media Processing or HMP is a design model in telecommunications systems that involves the use of software solutions to perform voice processing functions where dedicated Digital Signal Processors (DSP) were previously required.

In the age of Voice over IP (VoIP), components are connected via Ethernet or broadband links and use TCP/IP as the transport for voice as well as for data.  In this environment, it becomes possible to make voice calls without specialized DSP hardware by instead using PC-based software.  This software, or protocol driver functionality is often referred to as  Host Media Processing, since it is using the processor in the host PC (e.g. Pentium, Celeron, Sempron, Turion) to do all the telecom work.

HMP can be just software that you load into a PC, though in some situations HMP products work in conjunction with hardware (such as a board equipped with DSP processors) in order to offload computationally expensive operations such as echo cancellation and transcoding. This allows speech applications to scale to large numbers of concurrent calls, without bogging down the host CPU.

There are a significant number of voice, speech, conferencing and fax applications that have been written over the last decade.  This often means that backward-compatibility is a big issue, since if possible users want the applications to migrate seamlessly to the VoIP environment.  This usually means that HMP products expose one or more standard APIs that historically has been used to write telecom apps in the past.

References

Voice over IP